Sŭngri station is a railway station in Sŏnbong county, Rason Special City, North Hamgyŏng province, North Korea. It is the terminus of the Sŭngri Line from Sŏnbong on the Hambuk Line of the Korean State Railway, serving the large Sŭngri Petrochemical Complex.

References

Railway stations in North Korea
Buildings and structures in Rason